LEDA 83677 is a lenticular galaxy located about 290 million light-years away in the constellation Coma Berenices. It is a member of the Coma cluster of galaxies. LEDA 83677 is also classified as a type 1 Seyfert galaxy. The core of the galaxy is emitting high-energy X-rays and ultraviolet light, probably caused by a massive black hole lurking in the core.

See also 
 NGC 4477
 NGC 6814

References

External links 

Lenticular galaxies
Coma Berenices
83677
Coma Cluster
Seyfert galaxies